Ghane is a surname. Notable people with the surname include:

 Peiman Ghane (born 1980), Iranian scenic designer
 Shojaat Ghane (born 1975), Iranian chess grandmaster

See also
 Ghanem